Neophytos Larkou (born March 8, 1966)  is a former international Cypriot football midfielder and currently he is a football manager.

Career
He started his career from Pezoporikos but when Pezoporikos merged with EPA Larnaca, and AEK Larnaca was founded, he continued his career in AEK.

International career
As footballer, he made 41 appearances with scoring two goals.
In 2009, CFA appointed him as the assistant manager of Angelos Anastasiadis in the Cyprus national football team.

Coach
On April 15, 2011 he signed a contract with AC Omonoia, and managed to lead the team to the Cyprus Cup Final against Apollon Limassol. Omonoia would go on and win the final after a penalty shoot-out.

The 2011-2012 season did not start off without controversy for Larkou. While he had Omonia in first place, and on the right path, and playing excellent football, he along with president Miltiadis Neofytou, were accused, by a referee, for allegedly attacking him after a match. To make matters even worse, the Cyprus Football Association not only found them both guilty, but decided to discipline Larkou and Neofytou at the maximum possible level: a 6 month ban from the pitch. This would be the first time in his 28 year football career, Larkou faced any type of suspension. After a series of unfortunate results Larkou stepped down as coach of the club on September 19, 2012.

Honours

Manager

Omonia Nicosia
Winner
Cypriot Cup: 2011, 2012
Cyprus FA Shield: 2012

External links
 
 Profile at cfa.com.cy

1966 births
Living people
Association football midfielders
People from Larnaca
Greek Cypriot people
Cypriot footballers
Cyprus international footballers
Pezoporikos Larnaca players
AEK Larnaca FC players
ASIL Lysi managers
AEK Larnaca FC managers
AC Omonia managers
Alki Larnaca FC managers
Nea Salamis Famagusta FC managers
Cypriot football managers
Anorthosis Famagusta F.C. managers